Johnson Island may refer to:

Johnson Island (Georgia), an island in Georgia
Johnson Island (West Virginia), an island in West Virginia
Johnson's Island, an island in Lake Erie in Ohio
Johnson Island (Antarctica), an island in Antarctica

See also
Johnston Atoll, North Pacific Ocean